Carmen Electra is the debut studio album by American entertainer Carmen Electra, released in 1993.

Background
The album was a project designed by Prince to promote Electra, his latest protégée at the time, as a sexy female rapper. The album features music written by Prince with some input by band member Levi Seacer, Jr. Lyrics were provided by Prince, along with Seacer, The New Power Generation rapper Tony M. and female rapper Monie Love.

Reception

Three singles were released from the album: "Go-Go Dancer", "Everybody Get on Up", and "Fantasia Erotica". The album was not well received and effectively ended Electra's recording career. In interviews, she has pointed out that during the time of the album's release, Prince was having problems with his label, which could have contributed to its failure.

Track listing

Samples
"S.T." samples "Skin Tight" by Ohio Players
"Everybody Get on Up" samples "Get on Up" by The Esquires and "Singers" by Eddie Murphy
"Fun" samples the "ah yeah" part from "Here We Go (Live at the Funhouse)" by Run-DMC
"All That" samples "Adore" by Prince

Personnel
Art director – Greg Ross
Background vocals – Carmen Electra, Kathleen Johnson, Monie Love, N.P.G., The Steeles
Horns – Atlanta Bliss, Eric Leeds
Engineer – Joe Blaney, Mark Forrester, Coke Johnson, Michael Koppelman, Steve Noonan, Susan Rogers
Engineer assistants – Ray Hahnfeldt, Roy Hahnfeldt, Steve Noonan
Executive producer – Prince (as Paisley Park)
Guitar – Keith "KC" Cohen
Hair stylist – John Keoni
Keyboards – Keith "KC" Cohen, Joseph Markowitz, George Black
Make-up – Kasha Breuning
Mastering – Brian Gardner, Steve Noonan
Mixing – Keith "KC" Cohen, Mark Forrester, Tom Garneau, Kirky J., Rob Paustian, Junior Vasquez, Sylvia Massy, Steve Noonan
Mixing assistants – Airiq Anest, Dave Aron, Sylvia Massy
Photography – Lynn Goldsmith
Producing – Keith "KC" Cohen, Junior Vasquez
Producing assistants – Airiq Anest, Dave Aron, Sylvia Massy, Junior Vasquez
Rapping – Karen "K-Dean" Cover, Tony M.
Scratching – Brian "B-Quick" Crisp
Vocals – Carmen Electra, Tony M.

References

External links
Albums That Sucked - Carmen Electra! Review of the album by I-Mockery

1993 debut albums
Carmen Electra albums
Albums produced by Prince (musician)
Paisley Park Records albums